Marcel Hart (5 July 1909 – 27 January 1969) was a French Polynesian politician. He became Mayor of Uturoa in 1959 and a member of the Territorial Assembly in 1962, holding both positions until his death in 1969.

Biography
Hart was born in Papeete in 1909. He was a shipowner, owning Tamarii Raiatea until 1966, when he replaced it with Temehani.

He entered politics in 1946, becoming a member of the municipal council of Uturoa. In 1959 he was elected mayor of the town. In the 1962 elections he was elected to the Territorial Assembly in the Leeward Islands constituency, representing the Tahitian Democratic Union. He was re-elected in 1967, the same year in which his wife Alice died.

In January 1969 Hart died in an industrial accident; while visiting a road-building site, he began operating a bulldozer and a ground collapse led to it falling into a ravine.

References

1909 births
People from Papeete
Members of the Assembly of French Polynesia
Mayors of places in French Polynesia
1969 deaths